Florida Teacher Certification Examinations (FTCE) are standardized tests used to assess the competencies of prospective teachers according to Florida's Sunshine State Standards. FTCE refers to 47 different exams: four General Knowledge sub-tests, one Professional Education exam, and 42 Subject Area examinations.
 
Passing the appropriate FTCE exam is considered one part of the requirements for becoming a licensed teacher in Florida. Prospective teachers go through the Bureau of Educator Certification at the Department of Education to become certified. The Bureau advises that teacher candidates should submit an application for certification before applying to take certification examinations. Note: All teachers must have either professional or temporary certification by the Bureau of Educator Certification.
 
Paper and pencil tests are offered 6 times per Calendar Year, with 2 additional supplemental administrations. Supplemental administrations cost considerably more than regular testing dates. As an alternative to paper-and-pencil tests, many tests are now offered on the computer during the week at 36 locations throughout the state. The computer-based tests are equivalent to the paper-and-pencil tests in length and difficulty.

History 
The federal No Child Left Behind Act of 2001 (NCLB) requires that, in order for states to receive federal funding, all teachers must be "highly qualified" as defined in the law by the end of the 2006-07 school year. The Florida Department of Education has defined a highly qualified teacher to be one who has (1) fulfilled the state's certification and licensing requirements, (2) obtained at least a bachelor's degree, and (3) demonstrated subject matter expertise. The procedure for demonstrating subject matter knowledge depends on a teacher's tenure and level of instruction.

As a result, the FTCE began in 2002 to replace the College Level Academic Skills Test (CLAST). The test satisfies Florida Statutes 1012.56.2 (g), (h), and (i) to be certified as a teacher. The specific implementation is according to the Florida Administrative Code  6A-4.0021

FTCE General Knowledge test 
The general knowledge test is meant to test general education. There are four parts: English Language Skills, Readings, mathematics, and an Essay.

English Language 
Percent correct needed to pass on the easiest version: 73%

Time allotted: 40 minutes

Competencies Covered 
Conceptual and organizational
Word choice
Sentence structure
Grammar
Spelling
Capitalization
Punctuation

Essay 
Time allotted: 50 minutes

Competencies Covered 
Purpose
Statement of main idea
Organization of ideas and details
Provide adequate, relevant supporting material
Use of transitions
Command of Language
Avoidance of inappropriate slang, jargon, and clichés
Variety of sentence patterns
Consistent point of view
Conventions of standard American English

Mathematics 
A 4 function calculator is provided for this portion of the test.

Percent correct needed to pass on the easiest version: 60%

Time allotted: 100 minutes

Competencies Covered 
Number sense, concepts, and operations
Measurement
Geometry
Spatial sense
Algebraic thinking
Data analysis
Probability

Reference Sheet 
The reference sheet provided includes:
Area of a rectangle, parallelogram, trapezoid, and triangle
Area and circumference of a circle
Volume and surface area of a pyramid, prism, cone, cylinder, and sphere
The Pythagorean Theorem
Distance, midpoint, and slope formulas
A simple interest formula
Conversions between metric and standard units
a decimal (3.14) and fractional (22/7) approximation of pi

Reading 
Percent correct needed to pass on the easiest version: 73%
Time allotted: 40 minutes

Competencies Covered 
Literal comprehension
Inferential comprehension

FTCE Profession Education test 
The profession education test is meant to test education specific to pedagogy and professional practices.

Percent correct needed to pass on the easiest version: 73%

Time allotted: 150 minutes

Competencies Covered 
 Knowledge of instructional design and planning
 Knowledge of appropriate student-centered learning environments
 Knowledge of instructional delivery and facilitation through a comprehensive understanding
of subject matter
 Knowledge of various types of assessment strategies for determining impact on student
learning
 Knowledge of relevant continuous professional improvement
 Knowledge of the Code of Ethics and Principles of Professional Conduct of the Education Profession in Florida
 Knowledge of research-based practices appropriate for teaching English Language Learners (ELLs)
 Knowledge of effective literacy strategies that can be applied across the curriculum to impact student learning

FTCE Subject Area Examinations 
The subject area tests are meant to test the various subjects prospective teachers in Florida will be teaching.

Grades 5-9 
English
General Sciences
Mathematics
Social Science

Grades 6-12 
Agriculture
Biology
Business Education
Chemistry
Drama
Earth/Space Science
English
Technology Education
Journalism
Marketing
Mathematics
Physics
Social Science
Speech

Grades K-12 
Art
Computer Science
Educational Media Specialist (Includes Prekindergarten)
ESOL(English to Speakers of Other    Languages)
Exceptional Student Education
French
German
Guidance and Counseling (Includes Prekindergarten)
Health
Hearing Impaired
Humanities
Latin
Music
Physical Education
Reading
School Psychologist (Includes Prekindergarten)
Spanish
Speech-Language Impaired
Visually Impaired

Other 
Elementary Education (Grades K-6)
ESOL
Family and Consumer Science
Prekindergarten/Primary (Grades Prekindergarten - 3)
Preschool Education (Ages 0–4)

Passing Rates 
Passing rates for various test are shown in the tables below.  The tables list the percentage of first time test takers passing each exam, it then lists the percentage of all test takers passing for that year.

Results for the 4 sections of the general knowledge exam (GK) and the professional education exam are shown below.

Results of subject area exams are shown below

See also 
Praxis test

External links 
Official FTCE website
Florida Department of Education website regarding the FTCE
FTCE Test Facts and FAQs

References 

Specific test competencies 
Passing Standards 
2007-2008 Bulletin 

Educational assessment and evaluation
Education in Florida